The Men's omnium event of the 2016 UCI Track Cycling World Championships was held on 4 and 5 March 2016. Fernando Gaviria of Colombia won the gold medal.

Results

Scratch race
The scratch race was held at 09:46.

Individual pursuit
The individual pursuit was held at 16:02.

Elimination race
The Elimination race was held at 20:10.

1 km time trial
The 1 km time trial was started at 11:44.

Flying lap
The Flying lap was held at 15:01.

Points race
The Points race was held at 19:08.

Final standings
After all events.

References

Men's omnium
UCI Track Cycling World Championships – Men's omnium